Black Hollywood is the third album by Hip Hop duo Camp Lo, released on July 24, 2007, on Good Hands Records. It is the duo's first album in five years. The album is entirely produced by long-time collaborator Ski, who produced the majority of the group's first two albums, Uptown Saturday Night and Let's Do It Again. The album features guest appearances from Ski and Jungle Brown, who appeared on the duo's debut. The album's first official single is the title track "Black Hollywood" .

The album's original title was A Piece of the Action, a reference to the Sidney Poitier-Bill Cosby film A Piece of the Action. The group's previous albums were also named after films starring Poitier and Cosby. The song "Ganja Lounge" contains a sample from the voiceover at the beginning of the 1995 film Friday.

Track listing

Album singles

References

2007 albums
Camp Lo albums
Albums produced by Ski Beatz